District 13 of the Oregon State Senate comprises parts of Washington, Yamhill, Clackamas, and Marion counties, from Hillsboro to Keizer. It is currently represented by Republican Kim Thatcher of Keizer.

Election results
District boundaries have changed over time, therefore, senators before 2013 may not represent the same constituency as today. From 1993 until 2003 and from 2003 until 2013 it covered a slightly different area in the northern Willamette Valley.

References

13
Marion County, Oregon
Polk County, Oregon
Washington County, Oregon
Yamhill County, Oregon